Sings the Blues is a solo album by American rapper Pigeon John. It was released on Basement Records in 2005.

Track listing

References

External links

2005 albums
Pigeon John albums